Adriaan "Ad" Bax (born 1956) is a Dutch-American molecular biophysicist. He was born in the Netherlands and is the Chief of the Section on Biophysical NMR Spectroscopy at the National Institutes of Health. He is known for his work on the methodology of biomolecular NMR spectroscopy.

Biography
Bax was born in the Netherlands. He studied at Delft University of Technology where he got his engineer's degree (Ir. degree) in 1978, and Ph.D. degree in applied physics in 1981, after spending considerable time working with Ray Freeman at Oxford University. He worked as a postdoc with Gary Maciel at Colorado State University, before joining the NIH's Laboratory of Chemical Physics in 1983. In 1994 he became correspondent of the Royal Netherlands Academy of Arts and Sciences. He is currently the Chief of the Section on Biophysical NMR Spectroscopy at NIH. In 2002 he was elected a member of the National Academy of Sciences in the section on Biophysics and computational biology and a Fellow of the American Academy of Arts and Sciences. Bax was awarded the 2018 NAS Award for Scientific Reviewing and the 2018 Welch Award in Chemistry.

Work in NMR spectroscopy

Bax works in the field of biomolecular NMR spectroscopy, and has been involved in the development of many of the standard methods in the field. He collaborated extensively with fellow NIH scientists Marius Clore, Angela Gronenborn and Dennis Torchia in the development of multidimensional protein NMR. Bax is a pioneer in the development of triple resonance experiments and technology for resonance assignment of isotopically enriched proteins. He was also heavily involved in the development of using residual dipolar couplings and chemical shifts for determining RNA and protein structures.
Much of his recent work focuses on the roles of proteins in membranes.
He was the world's most cited chemist over two decades (1981-1997).

Work during COVID-19 pandemic 
Using laser light scattering, Bax examined how speech-generated droplets and aerosols may be a dominant SARS-CoV-2 transmission mode that may be mitigated by wearing face coverings or face masks.

References

External links
Oral History interview transcript for Ad Bax on 16 March 2020, American Institute of Physics, Niels Bohr Library and Archives
Lab Website

1956 births
Living people
Dutch biochemists
Dutch biophysicists
Members of the Royal Netherlands Academy of Arts and Sciences
Members of the United States National Academy of Sciences
Delft University of Technology alumni
People from Moerdijk
Fellows of the American Academy of Arts and Sciences
Nuclear magnetic resonance
Dutch emigrants to the United States
Bijvoet Medal recipients